Heraea or Heraia can refer to:

 Heraea, an obsolete name of the genus Saturnia
 Heraea (Arcadia), an ancient Greek city in the Peloponnese
 Heraean Games, an ancient Greek athletic festival
 Hybla Heraea, an ancient city in Sicily